Dominion 6.21 was a professional wrestling pay-per-view (PPV) event promoted by New Japan Pro-Wrestling (NJPW). The event took place on June 21, 2014, in Osaka, Osaka, at the Bodymaker Colosseum. The event featured nine matches, five of which were contested for championships. It was the sixth event under the Dominion name.

Storylines
Dominion 6.21 featured nine professional wrestling matches that involved different wrestlers from pre-existing scripted feuds and storylines. Wrestlers portrayed villains, heroes, or less distinguishable characters in the scripted events that built tension and culminated in a wrestling match or series of matches.

Event
In the first title match, Time Splitters (Alex Shelley and Kushida) defeated The Young Bucks (Matt Jackson and Nick Jackson) to win the IWGP Junior Heavyweight Tag Team Championship for the second time. This rematch from February's The New Beginning in Osaka was a result of the first day of the 2014 Best of the Super Juniors, where Shelley and Kushida scored back-to-back wins over Nick and Matt, respectively. In the second title match, Tencozy (Hiroyoshi Tenzan and Satoshi Kojima) made their third successful defense of the NWA World Tag Team Championship against former champions, K.E.S. (Davey Boy Smith Jr. and Lance Archer). The third title match saw Kota Ibushi make his fourth successful defense of the IWGP Junior Heavyweight Championship against the winner of the 2014 Best of the Super Juniors, Dragon Gate representative Ricochet. Post-match, Ibushi was challenged by both Kushida and El Desperado. This led to a title match on July 4 at Kizuna Road 2014, where Kushida defeated Ibushi to become a double champion. Dominion 6.21 also featured a follow-up to Back to the Yokohama Arena, where Takashi Iizuka turned on Toru Yano and jumped to Suzuki-gun. Iizuka teamed with Suzuki-gun leader and Yano's longtime rival Minoru Suzuki to defeat Yano and his new partner Kazushi Sakuraba, who had surprisingly saved Yano from the two on June 8.

The next match continued the storyline rivalry between the Bullet Club and Chaos stables, when IWGP Heavyweight Champion A.J. Styles and Yujiro Takahashi took on Kazuchika Okada and NEVER Openweight Champion Tomohiro Ishii. The match was a result of events that took place at Back to the Yokohama Arena, where Takahashi attacked Ishii and asserted himself the next challenger to his title. Later in the event, Ishii attacked Takahashi, when he was interfering in an IWGP Heavyweight Championship match between Styles and Okada. At Dominion 6.21, Takahashi pinned Ishii for the win, continuing the build-up to a title match between the two, which took place eight days later at Kizuna Road 2014 and saw Takahashi become the new NEVER Openweight Champion. In the semi main event, Bullet Club's Doc Gallows and Karl Anderson made their fifth successful defense of the IWGP Tag Team Championship against Ace to King (Hiroshi Tanahashi and Togi Makabe). The match also marked Makabe's return the ring, after he had suffered a mandibular fracture at Back to the Yokohama Arena, where he and Tanahashi had become the number one contenders. In the main event of the evening, Bullet Club's Bad Luck Fale defeated Chaos' Shinsuke Nakamura to become the new IWGP Intercontinental Champion.

Results

References

External links
The official New Japan Pro-Wrestling website

2014
2014 in professional wrestling
June 2014 events in Japan
Professional wrestling in Osaka
2014 in Japan
Events in Osaka